

Hypothalamic-pituitary axis

Hypothalamus

Pineal body (epiphysis)

Pituitary gland (hypophysis) 
The pituitary gland (or hypophysis) is an endocrine gland about the size of a pea and weighing  in humans. It is a protrusion off the bottom of the hypothalamus at the base of the brain, and rests in a small, bony cavity (sella turcica) covered by a dural fold  (diaphragma sellae). The pituitary is functionally connected to the hypothalamus by the  median eminence via a small tube called the infundibular stem or pituitary stalk. The anterior pituitary (adenohypophysis) is connected to the hypothalamus via the hypothalamo–hypophyseal portal vessels, which allows for quicker and more efficient communication between the hypothalamus and the pituitary.

Anterior pituitary lobe (adenohypophysis)

Posterior pituitary lobe (neurohypophysis) 

Oxytocin and anti-diuretic hormone are not secreted in the posterior lobe, merely stored.

Thyroid

Digestive system

Stomach

Duodenum (small intestine)

Liver

Pancreas
The pancreas is a heterocrine gland as it functions both as an endocrine and as an exocrine gland.

Kidney

Adrenal glands

Adrenal cortex

Adrenal medulla

Reproductive

Testes

Ovarian follicle and corpus luteum

Placenta (when pregnant)

Uterus (when pregnant)

Calcium regulation

Parathyroid

Skin

Other

Heart

Bone

Skeletal muscle
In 1998, skeletal muscle was identified as an endocrine organ due to its now well-established role in the secretion of myokines. The use of the term myokine to describe cytokines and other peptides produced by muscle as signalling molecules was proposed in 2003.

Adipose tissue

Signalling molecules released by adipose tissue are referred to as adipokines.

References

Endocrine system
Human physiology
endocrine organs